{{DISPLAYTITLE:C20H20N2O4}}
The molecular formula C20H20N2O4 (molar mass: 352.384 g/mol) may refer to:

 Nareline
 N-Feruloylserotonin

Molecular formulas